The Rolls-Royce Olympus turbojet engine was developed extensively throughout its production run, the many variants can be described as belonging to four main groups.

Initial non-afterburning variants were designed and produced by Bristol Aero Engines and Bristol Siddeley (BSEL) and powered the Avro Vulcan. These engines were further developed by Rolls-Royce Limited.

The first afterburning variant, the Bristol Siddeley Olympus Mk 320, powered the cancelled BAC TSR-2 strike aircraft. A further afterburning variant was the Rolls-Royce/Snecma Olympus 593, jointly developed to power Concorde in the 1960s.

The American Curtiss-Wright company tested a license-developed version known as the J67 and a turboprop designated TJ-38 Zephyr. Neither design was produced.

Further derivatives of the Olympus were produced for ship propulsion and land-based power generation.

Bristol Aero Engines, Bristol Siddeley and Rolls-Royce variants

Company designations
BOl.1/2A

BOl.1/2B

BOl.1/2C

BOl.2

BOl.3 Of all the early initial developments, BOl.2 to BOl.5 (the BOl.5 was never built), perhaps the most significant was the BOl.3. Even before the Vulcan first flew, the Olympus 3 was being suggested as the definitive powerplant for the aircraft. In the event, the 'original' Olympus was continuously developed for the Vulcan B1. The BOl.3 was described in 1957 as "a high-ended product intermediate between the Olympus 100 and 200 series."

BOl.4

BOl.5not built

BOl.6(Mk.200) The initial design of the second-generation 'Olympus 6' began in 1952. This was a major redesign with five LP and seven HP compressor stages and a cannular combustor with eight interconnected flame tubes. In spite of a much greater mass flow, the size and weight of the BOl.6 was little different from earlier models.  thrust. Used for first B2 Vulcan (XH533) only.

Rival manufacturers Rolls-Royce lobbied very hard to have its Conway engine installed in the Vulcan B2 to achieve commonality with the Victor B2. As a consequence, Bristol undertook to complete development using company funds and peg the price to that of its fully government-funded rival.

BOl.7(Mk.201)

BOl.7SR

BOl.11(Mk.102)

BOl.12(Mk.104)

BOl.21(Mk.301)

BOl.21R not built, proposed for R.A.E. Missile (A) designed to meet O.R. 1149 issued May 1956.

BOl.22R(Mk.320)

BOl.23 not built, proposed with a 301 compressor, 22R turbine and reheat to give  at take-off (reheat).

Service designations
Olympus Mk 97 This early engine tested an early annular combustion chamber. It was test flown on Bristol's Avro Ashton test bed WB493.

Olympus Mk 100 (BOl.1/2B) Similar to Olympus Mk 99 rated at  thrust for second Vulcan prototype VX777. First flew September 1953.

Olympus Mk 101 (BOl.1/2C) Larger turbine,  thrust for initial production Vulcan B1 aircraft. First flew (XA889) February 1955.

Olympus Mk 102 (BOl.11) Additional zero stage on LP compressor,  thrust for later production Vulcan B1 aircraft.

Olympus Mk 104 (BOl.12) Designation for Olympus Mk 102 modified on overhaul with new turbine and burners,  thrust initially,  thrust on uprating, standard on Vulcan B1A.
'Olympus 106' Used to describe the development engine for the Olympus 200 (BOl.6). Possibly a corruption of BOl.6 (Olympus 6).

Olympus Mk 201 (BOl.7) Uprated Olympus Mk 200.  thrust. Initial Vulcan B2 aircraft.

Olympus Mk 202 Disputed. Either Olympus Mk 201 modified with rapid air starter, or Olympus Mk 201 with redesigned oil separator breathing system. This was the definitive '200 series' engine fitted to Vulcans not fitted with the Mk 301. The restored Vulcan XH558 is fitted with Olympus Mk 202 engines.

'Olympus Mk 203' Very occasional reference to this elusive mark of engine can be found in some official Air Publications relating to the Vulcan B2. It is also noted in a manufacturer's archived document dated circa 1960.

Olympus Mk 301 (BOl.21) Additional zero stage on LP compressor.  thrust. Later Vulcan B2 aircraft plus nine earlier aircraft retrofitted. Later derated to  thrust. Restored to original rating for Operation Black Buck.

A team was sent to Boeing at Seattle to promote the engine in 1956 but without success.

Olympus 551 The Olympus 551 'Zephyr' was a derated and lightened version of the BOl.6 and rated at  thrust. The engine was the subject of a licence agreement between Bristol Aero Engines and the Curtiss-Wright Corporation – the engine being marketed in the US as the Curtiss-Wright TJ-38 Zephyr. There were hopes to fit the Olympus 551 to the Avro Type 740 and Bristol Type 200 trijet airliners which did not progress beyond the project stage. Curtiss-Wright also failed to market the engine.

Bristol Olympus (BOl) 22R (Mk. 320)
 
The performance specification for the BAC TSR-2 was issued in 1962. The engine, which was re-stressed for supersonic flight at sea level, and over Mach 2.0 at altitude, and featured much use of high-temperature alloys such as titanium and Nimonic, was a cutting edge derivative of the Olympus Mk 301 with a Solar-type afterburner.

The engine first ran in March 1961, soon achieving , and was test flown in February 1962 in an underslung nacelle in the belly of Vulcan B1 XA894 and was demonstrated at the Farnborough Air Show in September. In December 1962 during a full power ground run at Filton, the LP shaft failed. The liberated turbine disc ruptured fuel tanks and the subsequent fire completely destroyed the Vulcan.

On its first flight in September 1964 the engines of the TSR-2 were scarcely flightworthy being derated and cleared for one flight. Nevertheless, the risk was deemed acceptable in the political climate of the time. With new engines, the TSR-2 XR219 flew another 23 times before the project was cancelled in 1965. By this time the engine had accumulated 6,000 hours of testing, including 800 hours of operation in reheat, with an additional 61 flight hours in the Vulcan test bed, and a further additional 26 flight hours in the TSR-2 prototype XR219.

Rolls-Royce/Snecma Olympus 593

 
The Rolls-Royce/Snecma Olympus 593 was a reheated version of the Olympus which powered the supersonic airliner Concorde. The Olympus 593 project was started in 1964, using the TSR2's Olympus Mk 320 as a basis for development. BSEL and Snecma Moteurs of France were to share the project. Acquiring BSEL in 1966, Rolls-Royce continued as the British partner. 
593D Formerly Olympus 593.  thrust. (the 'D' in the engine designation equalling 'derivation' – for smaller, short-range version of Concorde that was later cancelled)
593B Flight test and prototype aircraft.  thrust with reheat. (the 'B' in the engine designation equalling 'big' – for long-range Concorde that subsequently entered service)
593-602Production. Annular combustion chamber to reduce smoke
593-610Last production.  thrust with reheat.
593-621Planned for introduction on 41st aircraft.  thrust with reheat.
593-631Planned. Additional zero-stage compressor, redesigned HP spool.  thrust with reheat.
593-series By the time of Concorde's withdrawal from service in 2003, the Olympus 593 had accumulated 930,000 flight hours, with more than 500,000 of these hours being supersonic.

Curtiss-Wright developments
Curtiss-Wright TJ-32 Examples of the BOl.1/2A were delivered to Curtiss-Wright in 1950. The engine was Americanised during 1951 and flew under a Boeing B-29 testbed as the TJ-32.
Curtiss-Wright J67 To meet a USAF demand for an engine in the  thrust class, the engine was the subject of a development contract, redesigned and designated J67. Development was protracted and in 1955, the USAF announced that there would be no production contract for the present J67. Several aircraft had been intended to receive the J67 including the Convair F-102 Delta Dagger.
Curtiss-Wright T47 The T47 was an attempt to produce a turboprop based upon the J67.
TJ-38 Zephyr See Olympus 551.

Other developments

Civilianised OlympusPlans to civilianise the Olympus go back as far as 1953 with the unveiling of the Avro Atlantic airliner based upon the Vulcan. However, most of the civilian derivatives, except for supersonic airliners, were developed from the BOl.6.

Thin-wing JavelinOne project that got beyond the drawing board was a supersonic development of the Gloster Javelin, the P370, powered by two BOl.6, 7, or 7SR engines. Eighteen aircraft were ordered in 1955. The project was abandoned the following year.

Afterburning Olympus As early as 1952, Bristol had considered the use of reheat, or afterburning, to augment the thrust of the Olympus. Initially, a system called Bristol Simplifed Reheat was devised which was tested on a Rolls-Royce Derwent V mounted in an Avro Lincoln. Later it was tested on an Orenda engine in Canada and on an Olympus Mk 100 in the Avro Ashton test bed.

Fully variable reheat became possible after an agreement with the Solar Aircraft Company of San Diego which manufactured bench units for the Olympus Mks 101 and 102. An afterburning Olympus was just one proposal for the Vulcan Phase 6, a  aircraft with a 13/14-hour endurance.

As an alternative to afterburning a fan mounted at the trailing edge of the wing was proposed for the Vulcan Phase 6. The fan was driven by a turbine in the engine exhaust at the end of the jetpipe.

Vectored thrust Olympus A vertical take-off Vulcan was proposed in 1960. It used 4 vectored-thrust Olympus as well as 10 lift engines.

Derivatives

Marine
 Rolls-Royce Marine Olympus

Industrial power generation
The Olympus entered service as a peak demand industrial power generator in 1962 when the Central Electricity Generating Board (CEGB) commissioned a single prototype installation at its Hams Hall power station. Power was provided by an Olympus 201 exhausting through a two-stage turbine powering a Brush synchronous alternator providing 20 MW at 3000 rpm. By 1972, the CEGB had installed 42 Olympus generating sets. Olympus engines are also used to provide backup power in case of a loss of grid electrical power at some of Britain's nuclear power stations.

Many sets were exported and many found use on offshore platforms. By 1990, over 320 sets had been sold to 21 countries, many of which remain in service.

Specifications (Olympus 301)

See also

References

Notes

Citations

Bibliography

 Baxter, Alan. Olympus – the first forty years. Derby, UK: Rolls-Royce Heritage Trust, 1990. 
 Bullman, Craig. The Vulcan B.Mk2 from a Different Angle. Bishop-Auckland, UK: Pentland Books, 2001. 
 Fildes, David W. The Avro Type 698 Vulcan Barnsley, UK: Pen % Sword Aviation, 2012, 

Olympus
Olympus
1950s turbojet engines